Asteridea croniniana  is a herb in the Asteraceae family, which is endemic to Western Australia.  It is an annual herb, growing to a height of 8 cm.

Etymology 
It was first validly published in 1888 by Ferdinand von Mueller as Athrixia croniniana, but Mueller gave the first description slightly earlier in the Victorian Naturalist 5: 54, from a specimen found near the source of the Blackwood River by a Miss Cronin, from whom it derives its specific epithet, croniniana.<ref name="apni2">{{APNI2|id=109921|name=Athrixia croniniana}}</ref> In 1980, G. Kroner assigned it to the genus, Asteridea, giving it the name Asteridea croniniana''.

References

External links 
 Asteridea croniniana occurrence data from the Australasian Virtual Herbarium

croniniana
Endemic flora of Western Australia
Eudicots of Western Australia
Plants described in 1888
Taxa named by Ferdinand von Mueller